John Poulett, 1st Baron Poulett (1585 – 20 March 1649),  of Hinton St George, Somerset, was an English sailor and politician who sat in the House of Commons between 1610 and 1621 and was later raised to the peerage.

Origins
Poulett was the son of Sir Anthony Poulett (1562–1600) (also spelt Paulet), of Hinton St George, Governor of Jersey, and Captain of the Guard to Queen Elizabeth by his wife Catherine Norris, daughter of Henry Norris, 1st Baron Norreys (1525–1601) of Rycote in Oxfordshire.

Career
He was educated at University College, Oxford and was admitted as a student of the Middle Temple in 1610. He was a Justice of the Peace for Somerset by 1613 to at least 1640 and was appointed Sheriff of Somerset for 1616–17. He was elected as Member of Parliament for Somerset in 1610 and 1614, and for Lyme Regis in 1621.

Poulett was raised to the peerage as Baron Poulett, of Hinton St George in the County of Somerset, on 23 June 1627. He served in the Royal Navy to secure English commerce and bullion ships from Dutch raiding expeditions. At the start of the Civil War he put his signature, together with those of other Lords and Councillors, to a declaration disavowing any intention by King Charles I to wage war against the Parliament, but as hostilities broke out he sided, on 15 June 1642, with the Royalist cause. At the time he commanded 800 men of the Somerset Trained Bands, but the men followed Lt-Col John Pyne, MP, into the Parliamentarian army. He was one of the principal commanders at the Siege of Lyme Regis in Dorset. At war's end, Parliament gave him a pardon, but his house was constrained to settle a large sum in reparations.

He died on 20 March 1649.

Marriage and children

Poulett married Elizabeth Kenn of Kenn Court in Somerset, daughter of Florence Stallinge. They had the following children:
John Poulett, 2nd Baron Poulett 
Florence Poulett, married Thomas Smith of Long Ashton and was the mother of Sir Hugh Smith, 1st Baronet.
Susan Poulett, married Michael Warton of Beverly Park, Esq., son of Michael Warton and Catherine Maltby (matrineal descendant of Anne of York, Duchess of Exeter)
Margaret Poulett, married Denys Rolle (1614–1638) of Stevenstone and Bicton in Devon, Sheriff of Devon in 1636.
Daughter, married Col. Richard Cholmondeley (1620–1644), of Grosmont, county York, Knight, a Royalist commander during the Civil War, and Governor of Axminster, who was killed at the Siege of Lyme Regis in Dorset in October 1644 and was buried at Brixton, Devon.

Notes

1585 births
1649 deaths
Alumni of University College, Oxford
Members of the Middle Temple
1
Cavaliers
English MPs 1604–1611
English MPs 1614
English MPs 1621–1622
High Sheriffs of Somerset
Somerset Militia officers
Burials at the Poulett mausoleum, Church of St George (Hinton St George)
John, 1st Baron